The Committed Citizens (CC) is a social liberal Andorran political party founded in 2011 for the municipal elections in La Massana.

History 
The party's first election is the municipal election in La Massana. CC obtains almost 50% of the votes in the ballot, ahead of the 3 other lists and obtains 9 of the 12 advisers. In 2015 the political movement takes part again in the poll and obtains 11 of the 12 advisers.

In 2019, the political party decides to stand for national elections. They present their candidacy for the 2019 parliamentary election, and obtain two seats in the General Council, Carles Naudi d´Areny and Raul Ferré Bonet. They are part of the coalition government led by the Democrats for Andorra.

For the municipal elections of December 2019, the movement forms a coalition with the  Democrats and the Liberals and obtains all of the seats in La Massana.

Electoral results

Legislative elections

Municipal elections

References

External links 

 
Political parties in Andorra
Political parties established in 2011